Polycitor is a genus of tunicates belonging to the family Polycitoridae.

The genus has almost cosmopolitan distribution.

Species

Species:

Polycitor adriaticus 
Polycitor africanus 
Polycitor annulus 
Polycitor aurantiacus 
Polycitor calamus 
Polycitor cerasus 
Polycitor circes 
Polycitor clava 
Polycitor columna 
Polycitor crypticus 
Polycitor crystallinus 
Polycitor cuneatus 
Polycitor emergens 
Polycitor epicolon 
Polycitor giganteus 
Polycitor glareosus 
Polycitor luderitzi 
Polycitor nitidus 
Polycitor nubilus 
Polycitor obeliscus 
Polycitor porrecta 
Polycitor profundus 
Polycitor proliferus 
Polycitor protectans 
Polycitor psammophorus 
Polycitor searli 
Polycitor spirifer 
Polycitor subarborensis 
Polycitor torensis 
Polycitor translucidus 
Polycitor violaceus

References

Tunicates